Nicki Pedersen (born 2 April 1977) is a Danish motorcycle speedway rider. He is a three time world champion having won the World Championship in 2003, 2007 and 2008. He has also won the World Cup with Denmark in 2006, 2008, 2012 and 2014.

Career
Pedersen began speedway racing aged 11 at Danish club Fjelsted. He stayed at the club until a move to in 1998 to Holstebro, the same year that he made his British league debut with Newcastle Diamonds in the 1998 Premier League speedway season. He topped the League averages which began his journey towards the pinnacle of the sport.

He started his Polish speedway career in 1999 with Polish Speedway First League club Start Gniezno and would go on to ride for ten different Polish sides. Elite League side Wolverhampton Wolves bought him for the 1999 season. He was at Wolverhampton for two years.

Pedersen took part in his first Grand Prix in 2000, as a wildcard in Denmark and impressed by finishing in fourth place. That year he qualified for the 2001 Grand Prix where he managed a third in the opening round in Germany and then earned a spot in the Grand Prix in 2002. He showed potential in the opening round in 2002, finishing third in Germany. Consistent scoring left him in 11th place in the World Championship after his first full year.

Pedersen had a bad start to 2002, but secured his GP place in 2003 after recording the first win of his career in the European Grand Prix. He finished the year in 12th place despite an inconsistent season. In 2003, he improved massively on his 2002 performance. He finished second in the opening Grand Prix of the season, and after a 10th place in the Swedish Grand Prix, Pedersen won again in Cardiff to give him a chance of becoming World Champion. Consistent high placings and four more podium finishes, including three in a row, secured the 2003 World Championship for Pedersen. 

He joined Eastbourne Eagles in 2003 and would stay for four years until the end of the 2007 season due to a change in ownership of the club and a reduction of the points limit for team building purposes by the British Speedway Promoters' Association (BSPA).

The 2004 season was less successful for Pedersen; he failed to record a win or a podium place. He finished in fifth place in the World Championship, well behind the two leaders Tony Rickardsson and Jason Crump. A second place in Slovenia was his best result during the 2005 Grand Prix season and he finished in fourth in the World Championship. Pedersen won the opening GP meeting of the 2006 season in Slovenia, but after that he fell behind championship leaders Rickardsson and Crump. He improved to finish third in the World Championship however, after a podium place in Latvia and a win in Poland. He won his first major team gold for Denmark after winning the 2006 Speedway World Cup.

Pedersen was dominant in 2007, winning four of the eleven Grand Prix, and finishing runner-up in two. He dropped only one point in the opening two rounds and had a run of six consecutive finals, which ended after an exclusion in the semi final in Great Britain. Pedersen won the penultimate Grand Prix in Slovenia and in doing so became the 2007 World Champion for a second time, after accumulating an unassailable lead at the head of the standings.

He successfully defended his title during the 2008 Speedway Grand Prix to become a three time world champion and join a select group of seven other riders at the time. He also helped Denmark win the 2008 Speedway World Cup (his second) and would go on to win four in total after winning again in 2012 and 2014.

He continued to perform at the major championships riding in every Grand Prix series until his last in the 2018 Speedway Grand Prix. He won the silver medal during the 2012 Speedway Grand Prix and bronze medal at both the 2014 Speedway Grand Prix and 2015 Speedway Grand Prix.

After international retirement he continued to ride in domestic speedway in Denmark, Sweden and Poland. In 2022, he suffered a serious crash when riding for Grudziądz in Poland, breaking  his hip and pelvis. He missed the remainder of the season. Pedersen retunred to British speedway in 2023 when he signed for Peterborough for the SGB Premiership 2023; he had previously ridden in Britain for the club in 2011.

Family
His brother, Ronni Pedersen, has also ridden in the Speedway Grand Prix and World Cup.

Major results

World individual Championship
2001 Speedway Grand Prix - 11th (52 pts)
2002 Speedway Grand Prix - 12th (73 pts)
2003 Speedway Grand Prix - Winner (152 pts)
2004 Speedway Grand Prix - 5th (113 pts)
2005 Speedway Grand Prix - 4th (102 pts)
2006 Speedway Grand Prix - 3rd (134 pts)
2007 Speedway Grand Prix - Winner (196 pts)
2008 Speedway Grand Prix - Winner (174 pts)
2009 Speedway Grand Prix - 6th (110 pts)
2010 Speedway Grand Prix - 10th (91 pts)
2011 Speedway Grand Prix - 10th (89 pts)
2012 Speedway Grand Prix - 2nd (152 pts)
2013 Speedway Grand Prix - 5th (121 pts)
2014 Speedway Grand Prix - 3rd (121 pts)
2015 Speedway Grand Prix - 3rd (131 pts)
2016 Speedway Grand Prix - 13th (62 pts)
2017 Speedway Grand Prix - 20th (8 pts)
2018 Speedway Grand Prix - 11th (74 pts)

World team Championships
2000 Speedway World Team Cup - semi final
2001 Speedway World Cup - 4th
2002 Speedway World Cup - 2nd
2003 Speedway World Cup - 3rd
2004 Speedway World Cup - 3rd
2005 Speedway World Cup - 3rd
2006 Speedway World Cup - Winner
2007 Speedway World Cup - 2nd
2008 Speedway World Cup - Winner
2009 Speedway World Cup - 6th
2011 Speedway World Cup - 4th
2012 Speedway World Cup - Winner
2013 Speedway World Cup - 2nd
2014 Speedway World Cup - Winner
2015 Speedway World Cup - 2nd

Grand Prix results

References 

1977 births
Living people

Danish speedway riders
Individual Speedway World Champions
Speedway World Cup champions
Sportspeople from Odense
Eastbourne Eagles riders
King's Lynn Stars riders
Newcastle Diamonds riders
Oxford Cheetahs riders
Peterborough Panthers riders
Wolverhampton Wolves riders